Yes I Am may refer to:

Yes I Am (Melissa Etheridge album), 1993
Yes I Am (Jack Vidgen album), 2011
"Yes I Am" (song), a 2011 song by Jack Vidgen